"Suddenly" is a song by American country music recording artist LeAnn Rimes, released as the second and final single from her fifth studio album, Twisted Angel (2002). It was released on February 24, 2003, and peaked at number 43 on the US Billboard Country Songs chart. A music video for the song was directed by Cameron Casey and released in 2003.

Track listings

UK CD single
 "Suddenly" – 3:57
 "Suddenly" (DJ Encore radio edit) – 3:53
 "Suddenly" (Riva radio edit) – 4:10
 "Suddenly" (Almighty radio edit) – 3:57
 "Suddenly" (video) – 3:57

UK cassette single
 "Suddenly" – 3:57
 "Suddenly" (DJ Encore radio edit) – 3:53

European CD single
 "Suddenly" – 3:57
 "Suddenly" (Riva extended mix) – 8:13

European maxi-CD single
 "Suddenly" (album version) – 3:57
 "Suddenly" (Click Music edit) – 3:36
 "Suddenly" (Riva edit) – 4:08
 "Suddenly" (Almighty edit) – 3:55
 "Suddenly" (DJ Encore edit) – 3:49

Australian CD single
 "Suddenly"
 "Suddenly" (Riva radio edit)
 "Suddenly" (Almighty radio edit)
 "Suddenly" (Almighty extended mix)

Credits and personnel
Credits are taken from the Twisted Angel booklet.

Studios
 Recorded at various studios in the United States and United Kingdom
 Strings recorded at Cello Studios (Hollywood, California)
 Mixed at Larrabee West (Hollywood, California) and Larrabee North (Universal City, California)
 Lead vocals mixed at Larrabee North (Universal City, California)
 Mastered at Bernie Grundman Mastering (Hollywood, California)

Main personnel

 LeAnn Rimes – vocals, background vocals
 Desmond Child – writing, production
 Andreas Carlsson – writing, background vocals, bass
 Jeanette Olsson – background vocals
 Corky James – guitar, bass
 Peter Amato – keyboards, production, arrangement, programming
 Gregg Pagani – keyboards, production, arrangement, programming
 Steve Ferrone – drums
 Humberto Gatica – recording (strings)
 Rob Chiarelli – mixing
 Bernie Grundman – mastering

Orchestra

 Joel Derouin – violin, concertmaster
 Charlie Bisharat – violin
 John Wittenberg – violin
 Susan Chatman – violin
 Michele Richards – violin
 Peter Kent – violin
 Sid Page – violin
 Sara Parkins – violin
 Margaret Wooten – violin
 Eve Butler – violin
 Ed Stein – violin
 Charlie Everett – violin
 Anatoly Rosinsky – violin
 Gerry Hilera – violin
 Bob Peterson – violin
 Ana Landauer – violin
 Denyse Buffum – principal viola
 Matt Funes – viola
 Simon Oswell – viola
 Darrin McCann – viola
 Kazi Pitelka – viola
 Larry Corbett – principal cello
 Dan Smith – cello
 Steve Richards – cello
 Rudy Stein – cello
 David Campbell – string arrangement, conducting
 Suzie Katayama – orchestra management

Charts

Release history

References

External links
 Suddenly official music video at CMT.com

2002 songs
2003 singles
Curb Records singles
LeAnn Rimes songs
London Records singles
Songs written by Andreas Carlsson
Songs written by Desmond Child